The Malayan free-tailed bat (Mops mops) is a species of bat in the family Molossidae. It is found in Indonesia and Malaysia.

References

Mops (bat)
Taxonomy articles created by Polbot
Taxa named by Henri Marie Ducrotay de Blainville
Mammals described in 1840
Bats of Southeast Asia